Joseph Quick may refer to:

Joseph Quick (engineer) (1809–1894), English waterworks engineer
Joseph Quick (Medal of Honor) (1877–1969), American seaman